The pygmy false catshark (Planonasus indicus), also known as the eastern dwarf false catshark is a species of ground shark, which lives in the Indian Ocean near Kochi, Kerala and off Sri Lanka. This species is one of two known members of its genus, the other being the dwarf false catshark which also lives in the Indian Ocean, but near Socotra. This had prior been an uncategorized species, but was recognized as a new species in 2019.

References

Pseudotriakidae
Planonasus

Fauna of Kerala
Fish described in 2018
Fauna of Sri Lanka